A Castle for Christmas is a 2021 American Christmas romantic comedy film directed by Mary Lambert. The film was released on November 26, 2021, by Netflix.

Premise
The story follows best-selling American author Sophie Brown, who travels to Scotland to escape the scandal of her last book. She visits the ancestral village of her father, whose own father worked as a groundskeeper at the estate of a nearby castle. While there, she ends up falling in love with the castle, Dun Dunbar, but must also face off with the ill-tempered duke who owns it.

Cast

Production
Dalmeny House, a Gothic Revival mansion to the north-west of Edinburgh, was used as the location for the film's Dun Dunbar Castle. Tantallon Castle was also used as a filming location. Parts of the film were also shot in South Queensferry. The village of Culross in Fife was used to portray the village of Dunbar.

The music in the film features the song "Celtic Heart" by Glasgow band Starsky & the Fox.

Reception

Writing for Variety, Courtney Howard called the film "gently disarming, heartening, holiday-themed escapism" and that it kept "genre-patented shenanigans and hijinks to a bare minimum, which is both a blessing and a curse." Writing for The Guardian, Jenny Colgan said there was "no jeopardy in this film at all: it is absolutely perfect for low-maintenance Christmas viewing" and that it was "lovely to see two great-looking actors who aren’t in the full flush of youth falling for one another." Gabriella Geisinger of Digital Spy said that the actors "manage to imbue their characters with a believable earnestness that belies the over cheese" and noted that the film was "mostly devoid of any socio-political landscape, which is a bit odd when a film is built on a system as controversial as aristocracy." The National said that the "main characters are obnoxious, the class politics are extremely dubious and the portrayal of rural village life incredibly patronising," but that "if you haven’t watched Cary Elwes try to catch fake snowflakes on his tongue, you haven’t lived." The imitations of Scottish accents and use of Scottish words and terms also met with mixed reactions.

See also
 List of Christmas films

References

External links
 
 

2021 films
2021 romantic comedy films
2020s Christmas comedy films
2020s English-language films
American Christmas comedy films
American romantic comedy films
English-language Netflix original films
Films about writers
Films directed by Mary Lambert
Films scored by Jeff Rona
Films set in castles
Films set in Scotland
Films shot in Edinburgh
2020s American films